Manitoba Centre for Health Policy (MCHP) is a public, not-for-profit research unit in the Department of Community Health Sciences within the Rady Faculty of Health Sciences at the University of Manitoba (Winnipeg, Manitoba, Canada). MCHP provides and uses population-based administrative data to inform health policy, social policy and health and social service delivery provincially, nationally and internationally.  MCHP also creates population-based research on health and the social determinants of health.

History of MCHP
The Manitoba Centre for Health Policy (MCHP) was founded in 1991 by Drs. Noralou Roos and Leslie Roos to study population health and health care services evaluation in Manitoba. MCHP developed and maintains a population-based data repository on behalf of the Government of Manitoba for use by local, national and international research communities. The Manitoba Population Research Data Repository (Repository) contains data on the health, social and economic status of Manitobans, and is used to determine provisions of health and social treatment and prevention services. The Centre’s work is based in Manitoba, but research has also been applied at the national and international levels.

Before the creation of MCHP, founders Drs. Noralou Roos and Leslie Roos conducted numerous health services and population health studies between 1973 and 1990 using data from the Manitoba Health Services Commission, now Manitoba Health. This research broke ground in how data was linked between health services and population health research. Dr. Noralou Roos held a National Health Research Scientist award for 25 years and was awarded a Canada Research Chair in Population Health from 2001-2007 as a result of this research. In 2021, Dr. Noralou Roos was inducted into the Canadian Medical Hall of Fame for her contribution to population health research by using linked administrative data to analyze the social determinants of health. Research by both Drs. Noralou Roos and Leslie Roos created recognition among peers, government and health care service providers of the benefits of population health research in Manitoba. MCHP was created as a result of these efforts.

Research
The population-based data repository contains a large scope of data. The primary research focus has been on Manitobans’ health status and the social determinants of health, however, the acquisition of social data into the Repository has expanded the research at MCHP to the well-being of Manitoban children, Métis and First Nations and the provision of services for these populations.

Some examples of research topics arising from the repository include: 

 acute and chronic diseases; 
 inequities of health and healthcare use; 
 use of nursing homes, primary care, hospital care, emergency departments, urgent and critical care; 
 use of prescription drugs and alcohol; 
 use of family services, income assistance, and social housing; 
 cost of hospital care and smoking; 
 Paramedic services data and health system contact after methamphetamine has been consumed; 
 educational outcomes; and 
 evaluation of screening and prevention programs.

Manitoba Health commissions research projects each year which are released publicly. Other research projects are led by research scientists and graduate students both within MCHP, as well as researchers outside of the institute.

Manitoba Population Research Data Repository 
MCHP houses the Manitoba Population Research Data Repository, a large collection of person-level data about Manitoba residents that has been de-identified (anonymized) and can be linked.

As of February 2022, there are 92 active data files that are updated annually, and a large number of additional data files that are brought in on a project-basis.  The Repository can be accessed by authorized researchers, graduate students and data analysts at MCHP and at nine remote access sites located at the University of Manitoba (Bannatyne campus) and Winnipeg Regional Health Authority facilities.

Most of these data are obtained from administrative data that are collected by Manitoba Health to help administer the universal healthcare system in Manitoba.  Data in the Repository provides information relating to health and health services use (e.g., diagnoses, prescriptions, emergency department visits), social services (e.g., income assistance, social housing, involvement with the justice system), education (e.g., Early Development Index, high school graduation) and surveys (e.g., Canadian Community Health Survey). 

MCHP also maintains a public documentation library which contains data descriptions and a concept dictionary. The purpose of the library is to provide current information about the data files within the Manitoba Population Research Data Repository, and methods for using the data in population-based research. Data descriptions provide information about the data file, relationships between data sets, data quality reports, and data dictionary with descriptive and statistical details about all data elements. The concept dictionary outlines methods developed at MCHP for analyzing data in the repository, including project-specific approaches, suggested readings and references.

Privacy, confidentiality and security
Users of data in the Repository receive mandatory training about the privacy, confidentiality and security practices at MCHP to protect the privacy of service providers (e.g., doctors) and users (e.g.,  patients). All data in the Repository are void of information that can be used to identify individuals. Data are protected by a high level of physical and virtual security at access locations.

The Team
MCHP staffs approximately 60 personnel including researchers, data managers, research managers, data analysts, research coordinators, research support, information technologists, knowledge mobilization specialists, finance officers, graduate students and research assistants.

Collaborators
MCHP collaborates with government departments and agencies to maintain and expand the Repository through data sharing agreements. Stakeholders that represent relevant government departments, government agencies, and service providers also participate as co-investigators or advisory group members.

See also
University of Manitoba
Manitoba Health Research Council
Canadian Institute for Health Information
Canada Health Act
CIHI
Health care in Canada
Knowledge mobilization
Manitoba Health
Metadata
Social determinants of health

References

External links
Manitoba Centre for Health Policy
Government of Manitoba website
Personal Health Information Act (PHIA)

Organizations established in 1991
Organizations based in Winnipeg
Medical and health organizations based in Manitoba
1991 establishments in Manitoba